Hussein Ali Awada (born 1 January 2000) is a Lebanese footballer who plays as a midfielder for  club Shabab Sahel, on loan from Ahed.

Club career 
In summer 2019, Awada was loaned from Ahed to Shabab Bourj. After returning to Ahed to compete in the 2021 AFC Cup and 2021 Lebanese Elite Cup, he was loaned back to Shabab Bourj in summer 2021 for one season. On 28 June 2022, Awada joined Shabab Sahel on a one-year loan.

International career 
Having represented Lebanon at under-23 level, Awada made his senior debut on 7 December 2021, as a substitute in a 1–0 win against Sudan in the 2021 FIFA Arab Cup.

Style of play 
Awada is a box-to-box midfielder.

Career statistics

International

References

External links

 
  (2020–present)
  (date of birth)

2000 births
Living people
People from Nabatieh
Lebanese footballers
Association football midfielders
Al Ahed FC players
Shabab El Bourj SC players
Shabab Al Sahel FC players
Lebanese Premier League players
Lebanon youth international footballers
Lebanon international footballers